Silvan is a city and district in the Diyarbakır Province of Turkey. Its population is 41,451.

History 
Silvan has been identified by several scholars as one of two possible locations (the other being Arzan) of Tigranakert (Tigranocerta), the ancient capital of the Kingdom of Armenia, which was built by King Tigran the Great (ruling 95–55 BC) and named in his honor.

Roman era 
In 69 BC, the army of Republican Rome defeated Tigran's troops in the battle of Tigranocerta. The city lost its importance as a thriving center for trade and Hellenistic culture in the following decades. In 387 AD, with the Peace of Acilisene, Tigranakert was made part of the Byzantine Empire.

Around 400 AD, the city's bishop, Marutha  (later, saint Maruthas), brought a large number of relics back from Sassanid Persia. These were relics of Christian martyrs persecuted under Sassanid rule. For this reason it was renamed Martyropolis (Μαρτυρούπολις), "city of the martyrs." Following the reforms of Justinian I (rule 527–565), the city was made the capital of the province of Fourth Armenia. The city was inconclusively besieged by the Persians in the last phase of the Iberian War.

The city suffered heavily in the Battle of Martyropolis in 588 AD, but soon prospered again.

Islamic era 
It was known by the name of Meiafarakin after the Arabs took over this region in the 7th century. It came under the control of the Hamdanids in 935, then the Buyids in 978, then it came under the Kurdish Marwanids and became the capital of the dynasty until the end of the 11th century. The city and the entire province of Diyarbakir were taken in 1085 by the Seljuk Malik-Shah I. During the following years, the city changed hands several times according to rivalries between Seljuk clans and local rulers. In 1118, the Artukids took the city. They resisted for many years the attacks of Zengi. The Artukid Husam al-Din Timurtash built the Malabadi Bridge near Meiafarakin, this bridge was one of the wonders of the time by its dimensions. The dynasty remained in place but preferred to reside in Mardin, leaving a governor to Meiafarakin

In early 1260, the city was besieged and captured, and its population was massacred by the Mongol army led by Hulagu Khan, with the help of his Georgian and Armenian allies. The Artukids eventually disappeared in 1408 under the attacks of the Qara Qoyunlu.

Ottoman Empire 
In 1896, reports by the British Vice Consul Hallward indicate that many villages were destroyed during the Armenian massacres in 1895. Hallward was engaged in the rebuilding of about 35 villages.

21st century 
Naşide Toprak from the (HDP) was elected Mayor of Silvan in the local elections in March 2019. She was dismissed in March 2020, and Mehmet Uslu has been appointed as a trustee instead of her.

Silvan was the site of serious clashes between Turkish government forces and Kurdish Kurdistan Workers Party (PKK) separatists in August 2015 during the wider Operation Martyr Yalçın.

Archaeology 
Archaeologists working in 2021, headed by the vice-rector of Dicle University, professor Ahmet Tanyıldız announced that they had discovered the graves of the Seljuk Sultan of Rum Kilij Arslan I who fought against the Crusader forces. They also revealed his daughter Saide Hatun's burial during nine days of work. Researchers dug two meters deep across a 35-square-meter area and focused their works on two gravesites in Orta Çeşme Park.

Ecclesiastical history

Notable people
 Ibn Nubata (d. 984), preacher 
 Ibn al-Azraq al-Fariqi (1116–1176), chronicler 
 Mehdi Zana (b. 1940), Former Kurdish politician
Yekta Uzunoglu (b. 1953), doctor, writer, human rights fighter, translator and entrepreneur.
Mahsum Korkmaz (1956–1986), first commander of the Kurdistan Workers' Party (PKK)'s military forces.
Leyla Zana (b. 1961), Kurdish politician
Hakki Akdeniz (b. 1980), Kurdish philanthropist and restaurateur from New York City.

Notable sites
 Malabadi Bridge

See also
Arrajan

Notes

Further reading 
Amedroz, H. F. "The Marwanid Dynasty at Mayyafariqin in the Tenth and Eleventh centuries AD," JRAS, 1903, pp. 123–154.
Minorsky, Vladimir. "Caucasica in the History of Mayyafariqin." BSOAS, Vol. 13, No. 1 (1949), pp. 27–35.

 
Kurdish settlements in Turkey
Populated places in Diyarbakır Province
Districts of Diyarbakır Province
Capitals of former nations